Theodore Aylward (1730–1801) was an English organist.

He was organist successively of St Lawrence Jewry and St Michael, Cornhill (1769–1781), in London, and of St. George's Chapel, Windsor (1788–1801). As well as these appointments, he was the Gresham Professor of Music (1771–1801). He is often confused with his Great, great nephew, Theodore Aylward Jr., sometime Organist & Master of the Choristers of Chichester Cathedral.

References

Notes

External links
 

1730 births
1801 deaths
English organists
British male organists